Jianyang may refer to the following places in China:
 Jianyang, Sichuan, county-level city under the administration of Chengdu, Sichuan
 Jianyang District, Nanping, Fujian
 Jianyang, Jiangsu, town in and subdivision of Jianhu County, Jiangsu